Biddeford Municipal Airport  is a public use airport in York County, Maine, United States. It is owned by the City of Biddeford and is located two nautical miles (3.70 km) south of the central business district.

Facilities and aircraft 
It has one runway designated 06/24 with an asphalt surface measuring 3,000 by 75 feet (914 x 23 m).

For the 12-month period ending August 19, 2008, the airport had 23,150 aircraft operations, an average of 63 per day: 100% general aviation with a few military. At that time there were 48 aircraft based at this airport: 96% single-engine and 4% multi-engine.

References

External links 
 Aerial photo as of 29 April 1998 from USGS The National Map
 
 

Airports in York County, Maine
Buildings and structures in Biddeford, Maine